Nankin-machi (Japanese for "Nanjing town") is a neighborhood in Kobe, Japan located south of Motomachi station adjacent to the Daimaru Department Store and is a major tourist attraction. Considered as Kobe's Chinatown, the area has over a hundred Chinese restaurants, shops, and a Chinese temple dedicated to Lord Guan (関帝廟, Kanteibyō).

History

Nankin-machi originated in 1868, when Kobe's port was opened to foreigners including Chinese immigrants from Guangdong and Fujian. The newcomers settled in the western end of Kobe's foreign district, which soon became the focal point for subsequent Chinese migrants. During that time, many Chinese people from the city of Nanking also immigrated to the city of Kobe, hence the name of the neighborhood "Nankinmachi" (Nanking Town). By the early 1920s, Nankinmachi was a vibrant area bustling with businesses, restaurants, and homes. That all changed, however, during World War II, when it was destroyed during the allied bombings of Kobe, Nankinmachi was re-built after the war by the remaining Chinese community that stayed behind in post-war Japan. In 1995, it was severely damaged during the Great Hanshin earthquake. It was quickly rebuilt, and once again thrives as a center of Chinese culture and activity throughout the Kansai region. There are currently 10,000 people residing in Nankin-machi.

Characteristics
Nankinmachi is considered a tourist attraction for the important role it plays in Kobe's cultural landscape was demonstrated in 1985 by the erection of an archway, Chang'an Gate (長安門). Subsequent projects include the addition of a pair of lions, granite floors, and other initiatives. Three archways demarcate Nankinmachi proper: Chang'an Gate in the east, Xi'an Gate (西安門) to the west, and Nanlou Gate (南樓門) from the south. There is no archway at the northern entrance, which is guarded by a pair of lions. A pavilion with stone carvings of the 12 Chinese zodiac signs marks the intersecting point of the north–south/east–west axis of Nankinmachi. This is a popular resting place for visitors, as well as a favorite spot for taking photographs.

Culture
 
Many establishments such as mahjong clubs and souvenir shops abound throughout Nankinmachi, but none are as prevalent as food businesses. Along the streets of Nankinmachi are restaurants and stalls that serve both Chinese Japanese food, Western steak houses as well.

Most shops show off their cuisine on display stands for potential customers. Some examples include dim sum, dumplings, buns, and Chinese pastries. During the Lunar New Year and the Mid Autumn season, two major festivals celebrated by Chinese people worldwide, New Year's delicacies and Moon Cakes appear.

Transport
Motomachi train station is 3 min from Sannomiya Station, 25 min from Osaka Station on the JR Kobe Line, and 30 min from Umeda Station on the Hanshin Main Line.

On the Hanshin Expressway: 3 Kobe Route, Kyobashi Exit and on the 5 Wangan Route, Rokko Island Exit

See also
Chinatowns in Asia
 Yokohama Chinatown
 Nagasaki Shinchi Chinatown
Chinese in Japan
China
Motomachi, Kobe

References

External links

Nankin Machi Official Website 
Kobe Overseas Chinese History Museum 

Chinese-Japanese culture
Tourist attractions in Kobe
Geography of Kobe
Chinatowns in Asia
Shopping districts and streets in Japan
Restaurant districts and streets in Japan